Current Township is a township in Texas and Dent counties, in the U.S. state of Missouri.

Current Township was erected in 1852, taking its name from the Current River.

References

Townships in Missouri
Townships in Texas County, Missouri